Kabelnoord (or officially known as NV Kabeltelevisie Noord-Oost Friesland) is a Frisian cable and fiber to the home (FTTH) operator, providing digital cable television, Internet, and telephone service to both residential and commercial customers, in the Dutch provinces of Friesland and Groningen. 

Kabelnoord was established in 1979 as a common utility company with the aim of connecting as many households as possible to cable television. In 1996 the company became a public limited company.

See also
 Digital television in the Netherlands
 Internet in the Netherlands
 List of cable companies in the Netherlands
 Television in the Netherlands

References

External links
  

Telecommunications companies of the Netherlands
Cable television companies of the Netherlands
Internet service providers of the Netherlands